Gonzalo Aguiar Martínez (born 11 April 1966) is a Spanish former cyclist. He competed in the road race at the 1988 Summer Olympics.

References

External links
 

1966 births
Living people
Spanish male cyclists
Olympic cyclists of Spain
Cyclists at the 1988 Summer Olympics
Cyclists from Galicia (Spain)
Sportspeople from Vigo